The high table is a table for the use of fellows (members of the Senior Common Room) and their guests in large university dining halls in anglo-saxon countries, where the students eat in the main space of the hall at the same time.  They remain the norm at Oxford, Cambridge, Dublin and Durham universities, where the university is organized into colleges. Other academic institutions (such as University of London; University of St Andrews; University of Manchester, University of Bristol and St.David’s University College in the UK, Queen's University, the University of Notre Dame in the United States, The University of Trinity College and Massey College at the University of Toronto, and the University of Hong Kong) also have high tables. 
   
The table is normally at the end of the dining hall on a raised platform, although this is not always the case. Typically, the high table is set across the breadth of the hall, and is thus at right angles to the tables in use by the main body of diners, which stretch along the hall’s length. On more formal evening occasions, dinner jackets are worn. It is also still common to wear academic gowns, at least for dinner.

The high table preserves what was the normal style of eating in large houses in the Middle Ages and into the Renaissance, when the whole household ate together in one hall, but in segregated and sharply differentiated styles. Traditionally the high table had chairs and the other tables benches, but today many halls have all-chair seating.  The food is generally different, often completely so.

Other bastions of this dining layout include some boarding schools (including the fictional Hogwarts) and the Inns of Court in London.

"High table" is sometimes used figuratively in a variety of ways to suggest things thought to be characteristic of Oxbridge fellows.

References

External links 

 High Table at Churchill College, Cambridge
 High Table at Princeton University

Tables (furniture)
Terminology of the University of Cambridge
Terminology of the University of Oxford
Traditions
Dining